No Thanks is a 1935 collection of poetry by E. E. Cummings. He self-published the collection with the help of his mother and dedicated it to the fourteen publishing houses who turned the collection down. The book is unconventionally bound not on the left but rather the top, like a stenographer's pad.

References

1935 poetry books
American poetry collections
Poetry by E. E. Cummings
Self-published books